Collateral is a 2004 American neo-noir action thriller film directed and produced by Michael Mann from a script by Stuart Beattie and starring Tom Cruise and Jamie Foxx. The supporting cast includes Jada Pinkett Smith, Mark Ruffalo, Peter Berg, Javier Bardem, and Bruce McGill. The film follows Max Durocher, a Los Angeles cab driver, and his customer, Vincent. When offered a high fare for driving to several locations, Max agrees but soon finds himself taken hostage by Vincent who turns out to be a hitman on a contract killing spree.

Screenwriter Beattie first conceived the idea for the film when taking a taxicab home from Sydney airport. Beattie shared the idea with producer Julie Richardson, who showed it to director Frank Darabont. The film was pitched to HBO but was declined. It was purchased by DreamWorks but would not see development for three years. Before the trio of Mann, Cruise and Foxx joined the film, Mimi Leder, Janusz Kamiński and Fernando Meirelles were each considered as director, and Russell Crowe and Adam Sandler were in talks to star as Vincent and Max, respectively. Filming primarily took place throughout Los Angeles, and was the first feature film to be shot with a Viper FilmStream High-Definition Camera. The musical score was composed by James Newton Howard, with additional songs from Audioslave and Paul Oakenfold.

Collateral was released in the United States on August 6, 2004, and grossed over $220 million worldwide. The film received critical acclaim in particular for the performances of Cruise and Foxx, Mann's direction and the editing. Collateral was chosen by the National Board of Review as one of the top ten films of 2004. At the 77th Academy Awards, Foxx received a nomination for Best Supporting Actor; while film editors Jim Miller and Paul Rubell were nominated for Best Film Editing.

Plot
Max Durocher is a meticulous Los Angeles cab driver trying to earn enough to start his own limousine business. One of the evening's fares is federal prosecutor Annie Farrell, who works for the U.S. Attorney for the Central District of California. On the drive to her office, they strike up a conversation and Annie gives Max her business card. Max's next fare is Vincent. Vincent tells Max that he is in Los Angeles for one night to complete a real estate deal, and offers Max $600 to drive him to several locations. Initially reluctant to violate regulations, Max eventually agrees. As Max waits at the first stop, a corpse falls onto his car. Vincent reveals himself to be a hitman and the body is one of five targets. He forces Max to hide the body in the trunk and continue driving.

LAPD undercover narcotics detective Ray Fanning arrives at the building where Vincent made the kill, and reveals the victim was a police informant. At the second stop, Vincent restrains Max's hands to the steering wheel. Max asks a group of young men for help, but two of them rob him and seize Vincent's briefcase. Vincent kills them both and retrieves the briefcase. Fanning arrives at the hospital morgue to see the bodies of criminal lawyer Sylvester Clark, Vincent's second target, and the two dead thieves, and realizes that this is the work of a hitman. Vincent orders Max to drive to a jazz club. At the club, Vincent engages the owner Daniel in conversation. Vincent then reveals Daniel to have been his third target, as Daniel is set to testify against Vincent's client. Max pleads with Vincent to let Daniel go, causing Vincent to offer a compromise, betting Daniel cannot answer a question about Miles Davis.

Daniel seemingly gives a correct answer, but Vincent unexpectedly shoots Daniel in the head, dissatisfied with his answer. He then reveals the correct answer. Learning of Max's nightly visits to the hospital to see his mother Ida, Vincent insists that Max proceed with the visit, where they inadvertently encounter Fanning in the hospital elevator but remain anonymous to each other. At the hospital, Ida is dismissive of her son's efforts but acts warmly around Vincent. She proudly tells Vincent that Max has his own limousine company, revealing Max has been lying to her for her approval. Overwhelmed, Max leaves, steals Vincent's briefcase, and hurls it onto a freeway where it is destroyed by a passing truck. With the information on his last two targets destroyed, Vincent coerces Max to meet drug lord Felix Reyes-Torrena to re-obtain the information.

Max, posing as Vincent, acquires the information but Reyes-Torrena orders his men to kill "Vincent" if he does not complete the job. Max heads with Vincent to a nightclub, seeking the next target, Peter Lim. Fanning, while seeking a connection between the three victims, visits FBI agent Frank Pedrosa. Pedrosa identifies the victims as witnesses in a federal grand jury indicting Reyes-Torrena the following day. Pedrosa thinks that Max is the hitman, based on FBI surveillance of Max entering and leaving Reyes-Torrena's bar, and orders the FBI agents to protect Lim. At the nightclub, Vincent kills Reyes-Torrena's hitmen, Lim, and his bodyguards. Fanning rescues Max and smuggles him outside, but Vincent fatally shoots Fanning and coerces Max back into the cab. Following their getaway, Max confronts Vincent about his nihilistic beliefs, and they trade insults just before Max deliberately crashes the cab.

Vincent escapes, but a police officer tries to arrest Max after seeing the corpse in the trunk. Max notices Vincent's open laptop, revealing that his final target is Annie. Max overpowers the police officer with Vincent's gun and rushes toward Annie's office building. Stealing a bystander's phone, Max calls Annie to warn her. Max reveals details about Vincent's previous victims, urging her to call 911. Vincent, who has armed himself with a gun from a security guard, corners Annie but is shot and wounded by Max, who escapes with Annie on foot. Vincent pursues the pair onto a metro rail train. Cornered on the train, Max engages Vincent in a sudden shootout. Vincent, fatally wounded, slumps into a seat. Max and Annie get off at the next station, as a deceased Vincent continues riding alone on the train.

Cast 

 Tom Cruise as Vincent
 Jamie Foxx as Max Durocher
 Jada Pinkett Smith as Annie Farrell 
 Mark Ruffalo as Ray Fanning
 Peter Berg as Richard Weidner
 Bruce McGill as Frank Pedrosa
 Irma P. Hall as Ida Durocher
 Barry Shabaka Henley as Daniel Baker
 Klea Scott as Zee
 Javier Bardem as Felix Reyes-Torrena
 Emilio Rivera as Paco
 Thomas Rosales, Jr. as Ramon Ayala
 Inmo Yuon as Peter Lim
 Jason Statham as Frank Martin
 Angelo Tiffe as Sylvester Clarke
 Paul Adelstein as Fed

Production

Development
When he was 17 years old, Australian writer Stuart Beattie took a cab home from Sydney airport and had the idea of a homicidal maniac sitting in the back of a cab with the driver nonchalantly conversing with him, trusting his passenger implicitly. Beattie drafted his idea into a two-page treatment titled "The Last Domino", then later began writing the screenplay. The original story centered around an African-American female cop who witnesses a hit, and the romance between the cab driver and his then librarian girlfriend. The final film has limited resemblance to the original treatment.

Beattie was waiting tables when he came in to contact with Julie Richardson, whom he had met on a UCLA Screenwriting Extension course. Richardson had become a producer and was searching for projects for Frank Darabont, Rob Fried and Chuck Russell's company, Edge City, which was created to make low budget genre movies for HBO. Beattie later pitched her his idea of "The Last Domino." Richardson pitched the idea to Darabont, who brought the team in for a meeting, including Beattie, and set up the project under Edge City. After two drafts, HBO passed on the project.

At a general meeting at DreamWorks with executive Marc Haimes, Beattie mentioned the script. Haimes immediately contacted Richardson, read the script overnight, and DreamWorks put in an offer the following day. Early drafts of Collaterals script set the film in New York City. Later revisions of the script moved the film's setting to Los Angeles. Darabont, Fried and Russell would remain on as executive producers.

Pre-production

Mimi Leder and cinematographer Janusz Kamiński were attached to the project at one point as the director. Brazilian filmmaker Fernando Meirelles had initially agreed to direct, but eventually decided to exit as the production would require him to relocate to Los Angeles for eight months. Meirelles described his vision for the film as being that of a comedy, and looked at telling it in a way similar to Martin Scorsese's After Hours.

Upon Russell Crowe expressing interest in playing the role of Vincent, development on the film moved forward. Crowe got his The Insider director Michael Mann involved, but after constant delays, Crowe departed the project. Mann then approached Tom Cruise with the idea of him playing Vincent and Adam Sandler in the role of Max. Sandler later dropped out due to scheduling conflicts with Spanglish and was replaced by Jamie Foxx. Beattie wanted the studio to cast Robert De Niro as Max, once again making him a taxi driver, though the exact opposite of Travis Bickle. The studio refused, insisting on a younger actor for the role.

Cuba Gooding Jr. revealed in a 2018 interview he had turned down a part in the film due to concerns he would be miscast. Mann's reasons for casting Foxx, with whom he worked with on Ali, was that he held a similar quality in his performances to Cruise. "I saw that [quality of Tom’s] in Jamie on In Living Color — his characters were so vivid. That’s why I went after him for [cornerman] Bundini Brown in Ali. Jamie starts with mimicry, but then he talks about ”putting it into the database,” so he can access a character once he's got it down". To prepare for his role, Cruise worked covertly as a FedEx deliveryman. Mann stated the goal was for Cruise to not be recognized.

Jada Pinkett Smith, cast in the role of Annie, spent time with an attorney to inform her performance. Val Kilmer was originally cast in the film as Detective Fanning, but exited to star in Oliver Stone's Alexander, resulting in Mark Ruffalo taking on the role instead. In a similar situation, Dennis Farina, initially cast as Agent Pedrosa, had to exit due to scheduling conflicts with the television series Law & Order, and was recast with Bruce McGill. Javier Bardem was cast in what was described as "a small role" at the time. Jason Statham made a small appearance in a role credited as "Airport Man". Louis Leterrier, co-director of the 2002 action film The Transporter, interpreted Statham's scene as a portrayal of his Transporter character Frank Martin.

Filming
After three weeks of filming, cinematographer Paul Cameron left the project due to creative differences with Mann. Dion Beebe was brought on to replace Cameron. Mann chose to use the Viper FilmStream High-Definition Camera to film many of Collateral scenes, the first such use in a major motion picture. Mann had previously used the format for portions of Ali and his CBS drama Robbery Homicide Division and would later employ the same camera for the filming of Miami Vice. The sequence in the nightclub was shot in 35 mm.

Filming took place throughout Los Angeles, with Los Angeles International Airport and Koreatown used for setpieces, and filming was also done in Pico Rivera, California. For filming of the cab crash scene, it was Foxx driving the vehicle, with Cruise in the backseat.

Music

James Newton Howard composed the score for the film, with additional music by Antônio Pinto. The Collateral soundtrack was released on August 3, 2004, by Hip-O Records, one notable omission from the soundtrack release is Tom Rothrock's "LAX" which plays as several parties head to the nightclub. Howard estimated that only half of the music he composed was used in the final cut of the film.

Track listing

Reception

Box office 
The film opened on August 6, 2004, in 3,188 theaters in the United States and Canada and grossed approximately $24.7 million on its opening weekend, ranking number one at the box office. It remained in theaters for 14 weeks and eventually grossed $101,005,703 in the U.S. and Canada. In other countries, it grossed $119,920,992 for a worldwide $220,926,695.

Critical response 

Collateral received positive reviews. On the review aggregator Rotten Tomatoes, the film has an approval rating of 86% based on 238 reviews, with an average rating of 7.5/10. The critical consensus states that "Driven by director Michael Mann's trademark visuals and a lean, villainous performance from Tom Cruise, Collateral is a stylish and compelling noir thriller." On Metacritic, the film had an average score of 71 out of 100, based on 41 reviews.

Stephen Hunter of The Washington Post praised the film and Cruise's performance. He summarized the film as "the best kind of genre filmmaking: It plays by the rules, obeys the traditions and is both familiar and fresh at once". Roger Ebert praised the performances of Cruise and Foxx, calling Foxx's work a "revelation". In addition to praising the performances of Cruise, Pinkett Smith, Mark Ruffalo and Javier Bardem, Mick LaSalle of the San Francisco Chronicle wrote of Foxx's performance: "Foxx can act. He's up to the role's demands, conveying fear, confusion and frustration, but more important the exhaustion and recklessness that can easily follow when someone's been scared for so long".

Desson Thomson gave similar praise to Foxx, finding the actor "quietly pries the movie from Cruise's big-marquee fingers". David Ansen of Newsweek praised the film, although he criticized its third act as "generic and farfetched". Placing the film on his best of the year list, Richard Schickel of Time magazine praised the acting in addition to Mann's direction and Beattie's screenplay, despite finding logical inconsistencies in the plot and that it "does not have quite enough completely compelling incidents to sustain its considerable length".

In a mixed review, Marrit Ingman of the Austin Chronicle gave positive remarks to Mann's film-making, but stated "There’s not much substance lurking beneath all the style, though the plot digresses into several awkward scenes intended to flesh out the characters". David Edelstein of Slate magazine highlighted Foxx's performance as "terrific" and was favorable to the film's first act, but derided the rest of the film. "It’s too bad that halfway through, Collateral turns into a series of loud, chaotic, over-the-top action set pieces in which the existentialist Mann proves he’s lousy at action". Edelstein also criticized the performance of Cruise, referring to his performance as "robotic".

Stephanie Zacharek of Salon magazine criticized Cruise's performance, finding that "Cruise's dignity rings stiff and false". Zacharek did praise the performance of Foxx, stating "Foxx inhabits his character so comfortably that he renders meaningless Vincent's babble about the tough, real world. Max is the one who lives in the real world, which is ultimately the point of the movie -- but it takes the picture a very long time to reach a conclusion that's evident from the start to any attuned viewer".

Richard Roeper placed Collateral as his 10th favorite film of 2004. The film was voted as the 9th best film set in Los Angeles in the last 25 years by a group of Los Angeles Times writers and editors with two criteria: "The movie had to communicate some inherent truth about the L.A. experience, and only one film per director was allowed on the list".

Awards

References

External links

 
 
 
 
 

2004 films
2004 action thriller films
2000s chase films
2004 crime thriller films
American action thriller films
American chase films
American crime thriller films
American neo-noir films
2000s crime action films
American crime action films
BAFTA winners (films)
DreamWorks Pictures films
Films about contract killing
Films about Mexican drug cartels
Films about taxis
Films directed by Michael Mann
Films produced by Michael Mann
Films scored by James Newton Howard
Films set in Koreatown, Los Angeles
Films set in Los Angeles
Films shot in Los Angeles
Films with screenplays by Stuart Beattie
Paramount Pictures films
2000s Spanish-language films
2000s English-language films
2000s American films
2000s Mexican films
Works about nihilism
Works about prosecutors